Dark State is a 2021 American mystery crime drama thriller film written and directed by Tracy Lucca. The film stars K. O'Rourke, Nicholas Baroudi, Melissa Connell, Constantine Maroulis, Antonio Corone and Katie Stahl. The film's art director was David Keane. The film had a limited release in the United States on March 19, 2021.

Cast
K. O'Rourke as Alicia Gazzara
Nicholas Baroudi as Rusty
Melissa Connell as Lilith
Constantine Maroulis as Adorno
Antonio Corone as Joeboy
Katie Stahl
Terence Gleeson as hippie

Reception
Alan Ng of Film Threat wrote "Dark State is a film with something interesting to say about the world around us and questions who is really in charge and what a person has to give up or compromise to fulfill that American Dream".

According to Marc Savlov of The Austin Chronicle, "That might be your cup of Bilderbergian-flavored hydroxychloroquine paranoiac politics but I found it to be yet another depressing reminder of how far we've fallen".

References

External links

2021 crime drama films
2020s mystery drama films
2020s mystery thriller films
American crime drama films
American crime thriller films
2020s English-language films
2020s American films